Camper Lifelovers is a Volvo Open 70 yacht. She finished second in the 2011–12 Volvo Ocean Race skippered by Chris Nicholson.

Career
The Emirates Team New Zealand design team joined with Camper sports company of Spain to develop and build Camper Lifelovers at Cookson Boats in New Zealand. The graphic elements of the boat was designed by Mark Farrow.

The yacht competed in the 2011–12 Volvo Ocean Race skippered by Australian Chris Nicholson, where she finished second after Groupama 4.

References

Volvo Ocean Race yachts
Volvo Open 70 yachts
Sailing yachts of New Zealand
Sailing yachts built in New Zealand
2010s sailing yachts
Fastnet Race yachts